Ozan Muhammed Kabak (born 25 March 2000) is a Turkish professional footballer who plays as a centre-back for Bundesliga club 1899 Hoffenheim and the Turkey national team.

Club career

Galatasaray
Ozan trained with the Galatasaray youth academy, joining in 2011. He signed his first professional contract with Galatasaray on 1 July 2017. Ozan made his professional debut for Galatasaray in a 2–0 Süper Lig win over Yeni Malatyaspor on 12 May 2018. This made him the first footballer born in the 2000s to play in the Süper Lig. On 24 October 2018, he played his first Champions League match in a 0–0 home draw against Schalke 04 in the 2018–19 season.

VfB Stuttgart
On 17 January 2019, Kabak moved to Bundesliga side VfB Stuttgart where he signed a contract until June 2024. On 3 March, he scored twice in a 5–1 win over Hannover 96, registering his first senior  career goals. In doing so, at the age of 18 years, 11 months and 7 days, he became the youngest Turkish center-back, and third-youngest Stuttgart player to ever score twice in a single Bundesliga match.

Schalke 04
On 30 June 2019, Kabak joined Schalke 04 on a five-year contract for a fee of €15 million, after Schalke activated a release clause in his contract. He was a regular performer in his first season with the club, appearing in 28 matches and scoring three goals. In September 2020, he was banned for five games and hit with a €15,000 fine after being caught spitting at Werder Bremen’s Ludwig Augustinsson. Kabak apologised to Augustinsson via Twitter afterwards, insisting the incident, for which he was shown a red card, was an accident.

Liverpool (loan)
On 1 February 2021, Kabak signed for Liverpool on loan for the remainder of the 2020–21 season. The deal was reportedly worth £1 million, plus potentially £500,000 in add-ons depending on appearances and Liverpool's performance in the Champions League. It also included an option to buy, which was set at approximately £18 million and could rise to £26.5m with add-ons. On 13 February 2021, he made his Liverpool debut in a Premier League game against Leicester City, ending in a 1–3 away defeat. On 16 February, he played in a 2–0 away win over RB Leipzig in the 2020–21 UEFA Champions League, becoming the first Turkish player to appear for an English club in the competition. At the end of the season, Liverpool declined to sign Kabak on a permanent basis.

Norwich City (loan)
On 30 August 2021, Kabak returned to England to join newly promoted Norwich City on a season-long loan deal with the club having an option to make the deal permanent at the end of the season.

1899 Hoffenheim 
On 23 July 2022, Kabak moved to 1899 Hoffenheim and signed a contract until 30 June 2026.

International career
Ozan is a youth international for Turkey. He captained the Turkey U17s at the 2017 UEFA European Under-17 Championship, and was listed as one of the 10 players to watch by UEFA. On 17 November 2019, Kabak made his debut in the Turkey senior team during the team's UEFA Euro 2020 qualifying match against Andorra, playing the full match which Turkey won 2–0. Kabak scored his first international goal on 16 November 2022 in a 2-1 friendly win over Scotland.

Career statistics

Club

International

Scores and results list Turkey's goal tally first, score column indicates score after each Kabak goal.

Honours

Club
Galatasaray
Süper Lig: 2017–18

Individual
Bundesliga Rookie of the Season: 2018–19

References

External links

 
 
 
 
 1899 Hoffenheim profile

2000 births
Living people
Footballers from Ankara
Turkish footballers
Turkey youth international footballers
Turkey international footballers
Association football defenders
Galatasaray S.K. footballers
VfB Stuttgart players
FC Schalke 04 players
Liverpool F.C. players
Norwich City F.C. players
TSG 1899 Hoffenheim players
Süper Lig players
Bundesliga players
Premier League players
UEFA Euro 2020 players
Mediterranean Games competitors for Turkey
Competitors at the 2018 Mediterranean Games
Turkish expatriate footballers
Expatriate footballers in Germany
Expatriate footballers in England
Turkish expatriate sportspeople in Germany
Turkish expatriate sportspeople in England